İkizpınar is a neighbourhood in the Şenkaya District of Erzurum Province in Turkey.

References

Villages in Şenkaya District